Kringkastingsselskapet A/S  ("The Broadcasting Company") was Norway's first radio broadcasting service and operated out of Oslo from 1925 until 1933, when it was taken over by the Norwegian Broadcasting Corporation (NRK).

History
The Norwegian Telegraphy Administration started examining the question of radio broadcasting in 1922. After consulting other countries, it recommended that the government own and operate the transmission infrastructure. In 1923 Norway abolished its earlier ban on listening to foreign radio stations without a permit. At the same time, the obtaining of a licence to transmit was made a legal requirement. Several companies had already banded together in 1922 with a view to obtaining permission to broadcast. The financing of their broadcasting operations was to be based upon a combination of the revenues obtained from on-air advertising and the licence fees payable by those purchasing and owning a radio set. In a bid to avoid some of the problems that had arisen in the United States, the administration tried to restrict the extent to which the manufacturers of radio sets could also own broadcasting stations.

Kringkastingsselskapet was granted the first permit in 1924. It had more than 2000 shareholders, the largest of whom were the Marconi Company, Telefunken, and Western Electric. Although owned by Kringkastingsselskapet, this was operated by the Telegraphy Administration. An additional five transmitters were built in Eastern Norway during the 1920s. These included Rjukan in 1925, Notodden and Porsgrunn in 1926, and Hamar and Fredrikstad in 1927. Norway was allocated three broadcasting frequencies in the Geneva Plan which became effective in November 1926. Further radio stations were established in Bergen in 1925, Tromsø in 1926, and Ålesund in 1927.

Kringkastingselskapet received permissions to operate in most of the country from 1928. A scandal hit the broadcasting company in 1929, in which a new transmitter at Lambertseter in Oslo had too little effect, and secondly following the discovery of management was enriching themselves. The former was caused by the Telegraphy Administration's not fully understanding the effects of radio transmission during design, and under-dimensioning the transmitter. The issue was resolved when the manufacturer, Telefunken, took the cost of converting it from medium wave to shortwave. New transmitters were installed in Kristiansand, Stavanger, Trondheim in 1930, Bodø in 1931, Narvik in 1934 and Vigra in 1935.

The scandal resulted in a proposal for a new organization of the broadcasting. At first Minister of Trade and Industry Lars Oftedal proposed a model whereby the transmission would be the responsibility of the Telegraphy Administration, and a new, private program company would be established, owned by the Oslo newspapers. This was opposed by Minister of Education and Church Affairs Sigvald Hasund did not want the sensation-oriented capital press from controlling the radio and wanted the government to have control. Mowinckel's Second Cabinet's successor in 1931, Kolstad's Cabinet, supported Hasund's line and proposed in 1932 that the government take responsibility for content. By the time the issue was being voted over by Parliament, Mowinckel's Third Cabinet was in place, proposing that the budgetary responsibility lie with the broadcasting company, not the Telegraphy Administration. The Norwegian Broadcasting Corporation was established in 1933 as a government-owned, national broadcaster.

References

Bibliography

 
 

Radio stations in Norway
Mass media companies of Norway
1925 establishments in Norway
Mass media companies established in 1925
Companies based in Oslo
Mass media in Oslo
Mass media companies disestablished in 1933
1933 disestablishments in Norway
Radio stations established in 1925
Radio stations disestablished in 1933
Defunct mass media in Norway